Vail fill is one of the fills on the Lackawanna Cut-Off railroad line in northwest New Jersey. Located between approximately mileposts 65 and 65.3 in Blairstown Township, the fill was constructed between 1908 and 1911 by contractor Hyde, McFarlan & Burke. The fill contains a total of 293,500 cubic yards of material. Vail Fill is located on a 1° curved section of track, permitting .

Vail Fill is named for the nearby hamlet of Vail.

References 

Lackawanna Cut-Off